Serge Laprade (born January 13, 1941 in Montreal, Quebec) is a French Canadian singer and a host on a number of Quebec radio and television stations.

Career
After his secondary education, he completed his university studies at Université de Montréal majoring in Social Science. At the same time he studied singing and theatre acting. In 1962 and 1963, he worked at the news service of the radio station CJMS. During the same period, he took part in a number of music and entertainment shows as an amateur singer and caught the attention of a number of producers. In the 1960s, he recorded a number of successful singles at the same time hosting his first television broadcasts. In 1964, he was named "male discovery of the year" at the Gala des artistes in Quebec.

He also led a successful career as a radio host on many radio entertainment shows on a number of stations, notably the radio stations CKVL, CKAC, CKLM, CBF, CJMS and CFGL and at the French Canadian television station at Radio-Canada, where he hosted notably a televised game show Le travail à la chaîne from 1972 to 1979. He also hosted shows in Télé-Métropole and Télévision Quatre-Saisons known as TQS. From 1971 to 1973, he was the director of programming at the radio station CKLM. He was also involved in charity telethons for more than a decade between 1977 and 1988 in favour of the Canadian Cerebral Palsy Association.

During the 1988 Canadian Federal elections, he ran as a candidate of the Liberal Party of Canada in the electoral district of Hochelaga—Maisonneuve, but failed to be elected. In 2003, he appeared in the film 100% bio directed by Claude Fortin and in 2011-2012, he made his "farewell tour" on the occasion of his 50 year music career.

His discography contained a dozen albums and almost 40 hit singles. He acted in three plays, Vacances pour Jessica in 1969 and Madam Idora in 1971 both with director Henri Norbert and in 1989 in Le grand oui, an adaptation of Ciel de lit with director Marie-Michelle Desrosiers.

Filmography
1970: Initiation
2003: 100% bio as actor and screenwriter
2008: Cul-de-Sac as Costa

Theatre
1969: Vacances pour Jessica
1971: Madam Idora
1989: Le grand oui

References

External links
Official website (from the Internet Archive Wayback Machine)

1941 births
Canadian male singers
Canadian television hosts
Living people
Singers from Montreal